Quercygale ("weasel from Quercy") is an extinct genus of placental mammals from extinct family Quercygalidae within clade Carnivoraformes, that lived in Europe during the early to late Eocene. Phylogenetic analysis of the basicranial morphology of carnivoramorphans suggests Quercygale is the most advanced member of clade Carnivoraformes as a sister taxon to crown group Carnivora, predating the split between Feliformia and Caniformia, although another recent study has proposed genus Quercygale should be placed as a stem group within Feliformia.

Taxonomy

Phylogeny
The phylogenetic relationships of genus Quercygale are shown in the following cladogram:

See also
 Mammal classification
 Carnivoraformes
 Miacidae

References

†
Miacids
Prehistoric mammals of Europe
Prehistoric placental genera